Haberdashers' Monmouth School for Girls is an independent school in Monmouth, Wales. The school was established by the Worshipful Company of Haberdashers in 1892, and continues to enjoy their support.

It is part of a family of schools known as the Haberdashers' Monmouth Schools. Together with its brother school Monmouth School they collaborate for certain activities such as drama productions and certain Sixth Form courses. They also share a coeducational nursery, Agincourt School. The girls' school consists of Inglefield House (ages 7–11) and the Senior School.

The Good Schools Guide described the school as a "friendly school that produces feisty young women" and noted its "diverse extra-curricular education".

History

HMSG was founded in 1892 by the Worshipful Company of Haberdashers. It opened in temporary premises at Hardwick House while the Company negotiated for a permanent location. In 1897 it moved to its present location. The main block was designed by the Haberdashers’ in-house architect, Henry Stock. Both the girls' school and its brother school Monmouth School became direct grant grammar schools in 1946 under the Education Act 1944 and became independent when the scheme was phased out. The prep school, Agincourt, was added in 1997.

Houses
Each girl belongs to one of the four houses, which are named after former members of the Board of Governors. The house system is separate from boarding houses.

Boarding
Girls aged 7 and above may board. Boarders reside in three main houses: School House (Years 3-8), Twiston Davies (Years 9-11) and Augusta House (Sixth Form, Years 12–13).

Academics
HMSG is one of Wales' top performing independent schools. In the GCSEs ranked second in the country in 2010 with a 100% pass rate and came third the following year.

Extracurricular activities
Girls are encouraged to take part in extracurricular activities and non-academic pursuits. There is a wide array of activities, groups, clubs and societies and sports teams that pupils may join. It became the first school in the country to employ a sports psychologist.

The Monmouth School for Girls Rowing Club and lacrosse team have been successful in recent years and team members have represented Wales in school and national competitions. In 2006 both the first and second lacrosse teams won the senior titles in both their categories for the first time in school history and in 2008 the first team was ranked in the top 4 in the United Kingdom and came first in their division. In 2012 several girls were chosen for the Wales lacrosse team for the Home Nations U19 championships. The Junior U16 rowing team won the Schools' Head of the River Race in the eights category.

Notable former pupils

Jackie Ballard – Former MP and Director General, RSPCA. CEO of RNID
Marina Diamandis – singer-songwriter (stage name Marina and the Diamonds)
Jane Glover – conductor and musicologist
Jenny Harries - Chief Executive of the U.K. Health Security Agency
Sandra Huggett – actress
Katrina Jacks – Commonwealth Rowing Championships Medallist
Zoie Kennedy – actress
Jemima Phillips – Official Harpist to the Prince of Wales (2004–2007)
Lisa Rogers – Channel 5 TV Presenter
Laura Tenison - founder of JoJo Maman Bébé

See also 
 Monmouth School (for Boys)

References

 Old School Photos

External links 
 Haberdashers' Monmouth Schools
 Senior School Website
 Inglefield House Website
 Profile on MyDaughter
 Profile on the ISC website
 Estyn Inspection Reports

Educational institutions established in 1892
Private schools in Monmouthshire
1892 establishments in Wales
Girls' schools in Wales
Member schools of the Girls' Schools Association
Boarding schools in Wales
Buildings and structures in Monmouth, Wales
Grade II listed buildings in Monmouthshire
Diamond schools